Vostochny is a rural locality (a settlement) in Vostochny Selsoviet of Tyndinsky District, Amur Oblast, Russia. The population was 1,191 as of 2018. There are 18 streets.

Geography 
Vostochny is located 15 km northeast of Tynda (the district's administrative centre) by road. Tynda is the nearest rural locality.

References 

Rural localities in Tyndinsky District